The 1955 Hawaiian submarine eruption was a submarine eruption that occurred  northeast of Necker Island on August 20, 1955. Steaming water, water discoloration and an eruption column took place during the eruption. A possible pumice raft was also witnessed. The eruption produced a column of smoke several meters high. It is probably the westernmost historical eruption within the Hawaiian Islands.

References

20th-century volcanic events
Volcanism of Hawaii
Hawaiian Submarine Eruption, 1955
1955 natural disasters
August 1955 events in the United States
Submarine eruptions